is a Japanese singer, actor, and television personality. He debuted as a member of Japanese boy band NEWS under Johnny & Associates and was also part of its sub-group, Tegomass.

Career

2002–2019: NEWS, Tegomass

Tegoshi entered Johnny & Associates during December 2002. He participated in various Johnny's Junior activities for eleven months before becoming a member of NEWS in 2003.

Tegoshi appeared with his band members on Johnny's related television shows, such as Shounen Club and Ya-Ya-yah, soon after he entered the entertainment business. Tegoshi quickly gained popularity with his singing and is considered by many fans to be NEWS' best singer. In 2005, Tegoshi landed the lead role in the movie Shisso, becoming the first member to star in a movie. Shisso aka Dead Run (International title) premiered in North America at the 2005 New Montreal FilmFest. He gained more acting roles in various Japanese dramas and continued his activities as a member of NEWS. He also hosted his own radio show, called "Tegoshi Yuya's What a Wonderful Music" from April 2005 to March 2006.

During NEWS's hiatus in 2006, he and bandmate Takahisa Masuda formed the duo Tegomass. They released the single "Miso Soup", recorded entirely in English, in Sweden that reached No.12 on the Swedish charts. Tegoshi debuted in 2007 as a voice actor for the Japanese release of the American animated film Happy Feet as the voice of Mumble. In July 2007, Tegoshi was given the opportunity to perform a one-man-show called Tegoraji.

In 2008, Tegoshi reprised his role as Ichitaro, for the sequel of Shabake called Shabake: Uso Uso. At the end of 2008, director Hans Canosa cast Tegoshi as Mirai for the movie Memoirs of a Teenage Amnesiac, based on the novel of the same name by Gabrielle Zevin. This movie is slated to premiere March 27, 2010 in Japan.

In 2009, Tegoshi took part in the musical comedy Dream Boys 2009 alongside fellow Johnny & Associates members Kazuya Kamenashi and Subaru Shibutani at the Imperial Garden Theater in Marunouchi, Tokyo. This was his first time being featured as a major character in this annual stage show. Not only did Tegoshi appear in the stage play, he also acted in a special drama for FujiTV titled Dareka ga Uso wo Tsuiteiru. He played, Sato Takahiro, a host and the son of a salaryman accused of groping a high school girl on a train. Tegoshi also participated on the running-themed variety show called Sōkon with fellow NEWS members, Keiichiro Koyama, Shigeaki Kato and Takahisa Masuda. The show was part of Lawson's green project campaign, where Lawson planted trees around Japan based on the number of points the members were awarded as they completed different running missions. At the end of 2009, it was announced that Tegoshi would take on the role of Toyama Yukinojo in the live-action drama adaption Yamato Nadeshiko Shichi Henge based on the manga of the same name. The drama aired January 15, 2010.

On October 15, Tegoshi was assigned to be the main caster for Toyota Presents FIFA Club World Cup Japan 2012. He hosted a new soccer sports show on NTV called "Soccer Earth" and the image song titled "World Quest" by NEWS for their new single.

2020–present: Solo career

On June 19, 2020, Tegoshi's contract with Johnny & Associates had been terminated. This followed events in April and May where Tegoshi was placed on suspension after attending drinking parties despite orders to stay home from the COVID-19 pandemic. Following his departure, Tegoshi held a press conference claiming that he left the company on good terms and that the tabloids had falsely reported a charity meeting as a drinking party. He announced plans to continue solo career activities including singing and that he had already intended to leave NEWS at the end of their Story concert tour.

On July 16, 2020, he announced that he had established his own company (Avalanche Co., Ltd.).

On August 5, 2020, Tegoshi released an autobiographical photo essay titled Avalanche, which discussed his career when he was contracted with Johnny & Associates.

On October 22, 2020, Tegoshi opened four hair removal salons TEGOSHI BEAUTY SALON (Kagurazaka, Kawaguchi, Shinsaibashi [women only] and Kawagoe [men's only]).

On May 11&12, 2022 Tegoshi hosted his first music festival "Supepura Tegoshi Fes 2022" for two days at Pacifico Yokohama.

On August 21, 2022, Tegoshi has announced that his new song "HOTEL" with English lyrics will be released on August 31st.

Discography
For releases as NEWS, see NEWS' Discography.

Singles

Studio albums

Studio mini albums

Filmography

TV dramas

Zero: Ikkakusenkin Game (2018) as Kotaro Shiroyama
Three Hundred Million yen Incident (2014) as Kenji Hamano
Deka Wanko (2011) as Ryuuta Kirishima
Yamato Nadeshiko Shichi Henge (2010) as Yukinojo Toyama
Dareka ga Uso wo Tsuiteiru (2009) as Takahiro Sato
Shabake: Uso Uso (2008) as Ichitaro
Shabake Shabake (2007) as Ichitaro
Hyoten 2006 (2006) as Toru Tsujiguchi
My Boss My Hero (2006) as Jun Sakurakoji
Gachibaka! (2006) as Minoru Utsugi
Gekidan Engimono (2005) as Hiroaki Tomiyama
15 Sai no Blues (2005) as Kōhei Sanada

Films
Hotaru no Hikari (2012)
Dareka ga Watashi ni Kiss wo Shita (working titled ) (2010)
Happy Feet (2007) (Japanese dubbing for Mumble) (Original voice done by: Elijah Wood)
Dead Run (2005)

TV series
 Ya-Ya-yah (2003–2007)
 Sekai no Hate Made Itte Q (2007–2020)
 Sōkon (2009–2010)
 SOCCER EARTH as main caster for "Toyota Presents FIFA Club World Cup Japan 2012″
 Tegoshi Yuya's Journey to Soccer World SP (2012-12-08)
 Hen Lab (2015–2016)
 Shounen Club Premium (2016–2019)

Stage
Dream Boys (2009)
Tegoraji (2007)

CM
House Foods: Tongari Corn (2005)
House Foods: Vermont Curry (2006–2007)
Calbee: Kappa Ebisen (2009)
Nintendo: Pokémon Black/White (2009)
Otsuka: Match (2011–)
Ajinomoto: Knorr Cup Soup (2012–)
Jobcan (2020–present)
Rady (2020–present)
Hotel Lovers (2021–present)

References

1987 births
21st-century Japanese male actors
21st-century Japanese singers
Japanese male pop singers
Japanese idols
Singers with a three-octave vocal range
Living people
People from Yokohama
News (band) members
Musicians from Kanagawa Prefecture
21st-century Japanese male singers
Horikoshi High School alumni
Japanese YouTubers